Céu is "Structured Synchronous Reactive Programming" 
According to its web page, Céu supports synchronous concurrency with shared memory and deterministic execution and has a small memory footprint.

References

Sources 

 
 
 

Programming languages